Politekhnichnyi Instytut is a station on Kyiv Metro's Sviatoshynsko-Brovarska Line. The station was opened on 5 November 1963, and is named after Kyiv's Polytechnic Institute located near the station. It was designed by G.V. Golovko, B.V. Dzbanovsky, E.L. Ivanov, and M.M. Syrkin.

The station has been laid deep underground and consists of a central hall with rows of columns near the platforms. It is connected to the street level by three escalators. The entrance to the station is located on the ground floor of the Kyiv Metro administration building, on the corner of Peremohy Prospekt (Victory Avenue) and Politekhnichna Street.

External links
 Kyivsky Metropoliten - Station description and photographs
 Metropoliten.kiev.ua - Station description and photographs
 mirmetro.net More pictures and description.
 Zarohem.cz- Photographs

Kyiv Metro stations
Railway stations opened in 1963
1963 establishments in Ukraine